Monica Seles and Ai Sugiyama won in the final 6–1, 6–0 against Julie Halard-Decugis and Chanda Rubin.

Seeds
Champion seeds are indicated in bold text while text in italics indicates the round in which those seeds were eliminated.

 Gigi Fernández /  Natasha Zvereva (first round)
 Yayuk Basuki /  Arantxa Sánchez Vicario (first round)
 Naoko Kijimuta /  Nana Miyagi (semifinals)
 Conchita Martínez /  Patricia Tarabini (quarterfinals)

Draw

External links
 1997 Toyota Princess Cup Doubles Draw

Toyota Princess Cup
1997 WTA Tour